ARH may refer to:

 Active radar homing, a missile guidance method
 Arkhangelsk Airport, IATA code
 The ARH gene
 Armed Reconnaissance Helicopter